Sociology of Religion is a quarterly peer-reviewed academic journal covering the sociology of religion. It was established in 1973 as SA: Sociological Analysis, obtaining its current name in 1993. It is published by Oxford University Press on behalf of the Association for the Sociology of Religion, of which it is the official journal. The editor-in-chief is Joseph O. Baker (East Tennessee State University). According to the Journal Citation Reports, the journal has a 2020 impact factor of 3.476.

References

External links

Publications established in 1973
Oxford University Press academic journals
Academic journals associated with learned and professional societies of the United States
Religious studies journals
Sociology of religion
Sociology journals
Quarterly journals